The Chhapra Jn- Varanasi City Intercity Express is an Express train belonging to North Eastern Railway zone that runs between Chhapra Junction and Varanasi City in India. It is currently being operated with 15111/15112 train numbers on a daily basis.

Service

The 15111/Chhapra - Varanasi City Intercity Express has an average speed of 46 km/hr and covers 224 km in 4h 55m. 15111/Chhapra - Varanasi City Intercity Express has an average speed of 43 km/hr and covers 224 km in 5h 15m.

Route and halts 

The important halts of the train are:

 
 Suraimanpur
 
 
 Chilkahar
 Rasra
 Ratanpura
 
 
 Dullahapur

Coach composite

The train has standard ICF rakes with max speed of 110 kmph. The train consists of 15 coaches :

 1 Chair car
 12 General
 2 SLR

Traction

Both trains are hauled by a Gonda Loco Shed based WDM 3A diesel locomotive from Chhapra to Varanasi and vice versa.

See also 

 Varanasi City railway station
 Chhapra Junction railway station
 Utsarg Express

Notes

External links 

 15111/Chhapra - Varanasi City Intercity Express
 15112/Varanasi City - Chhapra InterCity Express

References 

Passenger trains originating from Varanasi
Transport in Chhapra
Rail transport in Bihar
Intercity Express (Indian Railways) trains
Railway services introduced in 2012